The 2015 Radivoj Korać Cup season was the 13th season of the Serbian national basketball cup tournament.

The competition started on February 19 and concluded with the Final on February 22, 2015.

Venue

Teams
Eight teams competed in this years cup.

Bracket

Quarterfinals

Semifinals

Final

External links
 Basketball Federation of Serbia 

2014
Radivoj
Serbia